Khaled Al-Kaabi (born June 25, 1985) is an Emirati sport shooter. An Abu Dhabi Police First Warrant Officer.
Al Kaabi placed seventh in the men's double trap event at the 2016 Summer Olympics.
Al Kaabi gained a gold medal in Olympic Qualifier Asian Championship, India, which qualified him for the Olympics by winning the double trap gold at the Asian Shooting Qualifier ahead of Kuwait's Fehaid Al Deehani, a bronze medal winner at the 2000 Sydney and 2012 London Games.
Al Kaabi has received a major "morale boost" ahead of his double trap. The latest Asian rankings, which see him climb to No2 in the men's double trap.
Al Kaabi Won Gold Medal (Individuals) in Pan Arab Shooting Championship, Morocco 2015. 
Al Kaabi who is seeded 7th in the Olympic Ranking, won gold medal of Cyprus Grand Prix in Shogun 2017.

References

3. ^ "Double Trap Men Gold medal in New Delhi" ^

4. ^ "Rio 2016: UAE shooter Khaled Al Kaabi climbs in rankings" ^

5. ^ "Arab championship" ^

6. ^ "national team and Elite Club shooter Khaled Al Kaabi" ^

1985 births
Living people
Trap and double trap shooters
Emirati male sport shooters
Olympic shooters of the United Arab Emirates
Shooters at the 2016 Summer Olympics
Shooters at the 2014 Asian Games
Shooters at the 2018 Asian Games
Asian Games competitors for the United Arab Emirates